Artem Sheikin (Russian: Артём Геннадьевич Шейкин; born 25 March 1980) is a Russian politician serving as a senator from the Legislative Assembly of Amur Oblast since 28 September 2021.

Artem Sheikin is under personal sanctions introduced by the European Union, the United Kingdom, the USA, Canada, Switzerland, Australia, Ukraine, New Zealand, for ratifying the decisions of the "Treaty of Friendship, Cooperation and Mutual Assistance between the Russian Federation and the Donetsk People's Republic and between the Russian Federation and the Luhansk People's Republic" and providing political and economic support for Russia's annexation of Ukrainian territories.

Biography

Artem Sheikin was born on 25 March 1980 in Belogorsk, Amur Oblast. In 2001, he graduated from the Blagoveshchensk State Pedagogical University. In 2010, Sheikin also defended a doctoral degree from Saint Petersburg Mining University. From 2001 to 2003, he was engaged in business activities. Later he worked as a docent at the Saint Petersburg State University of Economics. In February 2020, he was appointed advisor to the Governor of Amur Oblast. In September 2021, Sheikin the senator from the Legislative Assembly of Amur Oblast.

References

Living people
1980 births
United Russia politicians
21st-century Russian politicians
Members of the Federation Council of Russia (after 2000)